Afghanistan and Canada established diplomatic relations in 1968. In 2003, Canada opened its embassy in Kabul and appointed its first resident ambassador. Afghanistan appointed its first resident ambassador to Canada in 2002. In August 2021, Canada closed its embassy in Kabul with the return of the Taliban to power in Afghanistan.

History

Beginning
Official relations between Afghanistan and Canada did not occur immediately, but developed over time. Canadians involvement in Afghanistan dates back to the 1960s, with the creation of the first Canadian development assistance program to Afghanistan. As the need for greater coordination of efforts by development agencies working there grew, the Government of Canada decided to establish full diplomatic relations with Afghanistan in 1968.

In 1971, Canadian aid to Afghanistan included 257,000 bushels of wheat, where drought had reduced production of cereal crops.

Soviet–Afghan War
The Soviet–Afghan War in 1979 and the installation of an authoritarian regime in Afghanistan led Canada to sever diplomatic ties. Even after the Soviet withdrawal from Afghanistan in 1989, the two countries did not re-establish full diplomatic relations, and contact was minimal despite humanitarian aid efforts by Canada in the 1990s.

Taliban period
The Taliban took control of Afghanistan in 1996. Canada became an outspoken critic of the Taliban's human rights abuses against the citizens of Afghanistan. Canada continued to provide humanitarian aid to the country despite Taliban restrictions on aid agencies.

War in Afghanistan

The September 11, 2001 terrorist attacks prompted Canada to re-evaluate its policies toward Afghanistan. The Minister of National Defence Art Eggleton authorized more than 100 Canadian Forces members serving on military exchange programs in the United States and other countries to participate in the War in Afghanistan. Although Canada did not participate in the opening days of the war, Prime Minister Jean Chrétien announced on October 7 that Canada would contribute forces to the international force being formed to conduct a campaign against terrorism. General Ray Henault, the Chief of the Defence Staff, issued preliminary orders to several CF units, as Operation Apollo was established. The Canadian commitment was originally planned to last to October 2003.

Canada re-established diplomatic relations with Afghanistan on January 25, 2002.

Diplomatic relationships

Canada has an embassy in Kabul. In July 2009, an agreement on handing over of eight acre land by the Afghan government to Canadian embassy was signed in Kabul by the Afghan Minister of Foreign Affairs (Rangeen Dadfar Spanta) and the Canadian ambassador (Ron Hoffmann). The Islamic Republic of Afghanistan has an embassy in Ottawa and a consulate in Toronto. One recent Canadian ambassador was Glenn V. Davidson.  His successor was Deborah Lyons, a long-time federal civil servant, Deborah Lyons' successor was Kenneth Neufeld and the current ambassador is Francois Rivest.  Afghan ambassador Jawed Ludin. completed his assignment in Ottawa in December 2010 and the position was filled by Barna Karimi in March 2012, the current ambassador is Shinkai Karokhel, the former MP in Afghan parliament and defender of women rights. The Canadian Embassy in Kabul temporarily suspended operations citing safety concerns as the Taliban breached the capital.

Embassy of Afghanistan, Ottawa

The Embassy of Afghanistan  is the Islamic Republic of Afghanistan's embassy in Canada. It is located at 240 Algyre Avenue in Ottawa, Ontario, Canada.

The embassy has been accredited to the United States since the closure of the Embassy in the U.S. in 2022.

Afghan Ambassador to Canada
List of Afghan Representatives in Ottawa since 2002:
 M. Sharif Ghalib April 2002 – Minister Counsellor, Chargé d'Affaires
 Abdul Jalil Jamily October 2002 – November 2003 – Ambassador
 M. Sharif Ghalib November 2003 – September 2004 – Minister Counsellor, Chargé d'Affaires
 Omar Samad September 2004 – June 2009 – Ambassador
 Jawed Ludin June 2009 – February 2011 – Ambassador
 Ershad Ahmadi February 2011 – March 2012 – Minister Counsellor, Chargé d'Affaires
 Barna Karimi March 2012 – 2013
 Shaam Lal Patija 2013–2014
 there was no ambassador for a while
 Shinkai Karokhel 2016-2018
 Hassan Soroosh is the current ambassador 
Source: Afghan Embassay

Canadian Ambassador to Afghanistan

 Ron Hoffmann 2007–2010
 William Crosbie 2010–2012
 Glenn V. Davidson 2012–2013
 Deborah Lyons 2013–2016
 Kenneth Neufeld 2016–2017
 Francois Rivest 2017–2021

References

External links

 
Canada
Bilateral relations of Canada